Jake Thomas Walker (born 3 November 2000) is an English footballer who plays as a right-back and right-sided midfielder for Cymru Premier team Newtown. Walker is a product of the Aston Villa Academy and made one appearance for the senior side in the 2020-21 FA Cup, as well as appearing in the EFL Trophy for their U21 side. He has previously played on loan at Southern Football League sides Banbury United and Alvechurch.

Career

Aston Villa 
Walker joined the Aston Villa Academy at the age of nine and was given his first professional contract, a two-year deal, in 2019. Walker joined Banbury United on loan until the end of the season in January 2020. He joined Alvechurch on loan in October 2020, but was recalled in January 2021. Walker was named in the Aston Villa starting line-up for his senior debut on 8 January 2021 in an FA Cup third round tie against Liverpool.

Walker was released by Aston Villa at the end of the 2020–21 season.

Newtown 
On 7 August 2021, Walker signed a semi-professional contract with Newtown in the Cymru Premier. He made his debut on 15 August 2021, in a 4–1 defeat to The New Saints. During his first season, he moved from defence into midfield. He scored his first goal in senior football on 18 December 2021, in a 2–0 victory over Flint Town United.

Career statistics

Club

Notes

References

External links
 

2000 births
Living people
English footballers
Association football fullbacks
Aston Villa F.C. players
Banbury United F.C. players
Alvechurch F.C. players
Newtown A.F.C. players
Cymru Premier players
Sportspeople from Shrewsbury
Association football midfielders